LATT may refer to:
 Lady and the Tramp, a 1955 American animated romantic comedy film
 Library Association of Trinidad and Tobago - see List of library associations
 Los Angeles Trade Tech (educational institution; Los Angeles, California)
 Lake Asphalt of Trinidad and Tobago
 Learning All the Time - see John Holt (educator)

See also